KDE Display Manager (KDM) is a display manager (a graphical login program) developed by KDE for the windowing systems X11.

KDE Display Manager was based on the source code of X display manager and was the default display manager of the KDE Software Compilation, until it was retired in KDE Plasma 5 in favour of SDDM.

KDM allowed the user to choose a desktop environment or window manager at login. KDM used the Qt application framework. It is configurable via KDE's System Settings; its appearance can be customized by the user.

The default KDM login screen had a list of users. Each entry was comprised in the user's username, personal name (if available), and an icon. Next to the list is a greeting and a picture. One of the customization options is to replace the picture with an analog clock. From this screen the user can also run a user management tool, shut down or reboot the computer, or restart the X Window System.

See also 

 getty – a non-graphical login program
 Simple Desktop Display Manager (SDDM), successor to KDM
 GDM, the GNOME display manager.
 LightDM, the Light display manager, was written for Ubuntu, now independent.

References

External links 

 The KDM Handbook
 KDM Themes (KDE-Look.org)

KDE Software Compilation
Software that uses Qt
X display managers